Charles Honoris (born in Jakarta) is a member of the Indonesian House of Representatives from the Indonesian Democratic Party - Struggle (PDI-P). He was elected from the DKI Jakarta III (North Jakarta, West Jakarta and the Thousand Islands) electoral district with 102,408 votes. Currently he is serving as vice-chairperson of Commission IX of the House of Representatives overseeing Health Services and Manpower.  He was previously a member of Commission I of the House of Representatives overseeing Defence, Foreign Affairs, Intelligence, Communications and Informations.  He is married to Irene Bertina Irawan and resides in West Jakarta. Charles is the son of Indonesian businessman Luntungan Honoris.

Charles was educated in political science at the International Christian University in Japan. An active writer, he has written since his college days on issues related to politics, human rights and international relations published in several Indonesian national media.

Charles Honoris is also vice-chair of the Indonesian Chamber of Commerce (KADIN) overseeing healthcare.

Education 
 Sekolah Pelita Harapan primary school, Karawaci Indonesia, 1996
 Sekolah Pelita Harapan secondary school, Karawaci Indonesia, 1999
 Christ Church Grammar School, Australia, 2001
 International Christian University, Tokyo, 2007

Family 
Charles is the fifth child of Luntungan Honoris, an Indonesian businessman who together with 8 other Indonesian entrepreneurs participated with Bill Gates in donating US 80 million dollars into Indonesia Health Fund.

Luntungan Honoris is listed as president commissioner of property company PT. Modernland Realty Tbk and member of the Board of Protective Harmony Family of South Sulawesi.

Work 
 Associate, Hanafiah Ponggawa & Partners 2007 - 2009
 Direktur, PT. Foton Mobilindo, 2009
 Vice President, PT. Modernland Realty Tbk, 2012

Elected as member of the House of Representatives (2014-2019) 
'Charles Honoris'  who is also Chairman of Taruna Merah Putih Jakarta chapter, a youth wing organization of PDI-P was elected as a member of the Indonesian House of Representatives during the elections held on 9 April 2014 for a five-year term.  Charles received the most votes in his electoral district with 96,842 votes surpassing senior politicians such as Effendi Simbolon and Speaker of the House of Representatives Marzuki Alie from the Democratic Party.

Re-election to the House of Representatives (2019-2024) 
In the 2019 election Charles Honoris was re-elected to the House of Representatives with 102,408 votes.

References

External links 
 
 The Jakarta Post: It's time to be truthful about the past
  Mengenal Lebih Dekat pada website Charles Honoris
  Profil Caleg di BeritaSatu.com
  Berita tentang Charles Honoris di pemilu 2014

1984 births
Living people
Indonesian Democratic Party of Struggle politicians
Members of the People's Representative Council, 2014
Members of the People's Representative Council, 2019
International Christian University alumni
Indonesian people of Chinese descent
Indonesian Christians
Politicians from Jakarta